Samuel Holmes Fullerton was a lumber baron and president as well as vice-president of several companies. He was the founder and president of the Gulf Lumber Company,

Early life
Samuel's parents were Samuel and Anna (Holmes) Fullerton, Samuel was born in Ireland, and immigrated to the United States when seventeen years old. He married Lucy Cook, of Clay Center, Kansas and they had three children; Robert, Ruby, and Samuel Baker Fullerton.

Business ventures
Fullerton owned sawmills in Arkansas, Idaho, Louisiana, Minnesota, Mississippi, Washington, and Wisconsin.

Gulf Lumber Company
Fullerton founded the Gulf Lumber Company (1907-1927) in Fullerton, Louisiana after purchasing 
 for 6 million dollars, building the largest sawmill in the region, largest west of the Mississippi, and second in size only to the Great Southern Lumber Company in Bogalusa. The mill cost 3.5 million dollars to build. During the company's operation the mill cut 2.25 billion board feet that involved the cutting of 4.2 million trees.

Railroads
In 1910 work began on the Gulf and Sabine River Railroad. The  line was to connect the Fullerton mill to Leesville and the Santa Fe Railroad to Lake Charles.

References

1852 births
1939 deaths
Businesspeople from Kansas City, Missouri
Businesspeople in timber
Defunct companies based in Louisiana